Nebria tetungi is a species of ground beetle in the Nebriinae subfamily that can be found in Gansu, Qinghai, and Sichuan provinces of China.

References

tetungi
Beetles described in 1982
Beetles of Asia
Endemic fauna of China